Directive 2010/18/EU is a directive which concerns the basic rights of all parents to leave in the European Union. It was repealed and replaced by Directive (EU) 2019/1158.

Contents
The main provisions of the directive are as follows:
cl 2(1) time to care for children up to eight years old (2) for a minimum of four months
cl 3(1) conditions that may apply include (a) leave on a full or part-time basis or piecemeal (b) a qualifying period under a year (c) under what circumstances an employer may postpone (d) special arrangements for small business (2) notice periods with regard to the worker
cl 4, specific needs for adoptive parents
cl 5, employment rights and non-discrimination (1) right to return to job, or if impossible, a similar one consistent with the contract (2) acquired rights to be maintained
cl 6(1) return to work should allow for reasonable variations. (2) both encouraged to keep contact while away.
cl 7, time off for urgent family reasons, sickness or accident.
cl 8, can be more favourable

See also
European labour law
United Kingdom labour law

References

External links
Text of the directive

European Union directives
European Union employment directives
Parental leave in Europe
Working time